Obiri is a surname. Notable people with the surname include:

Hellen Obiri (born 1989), Kenyan athlete
Innocent Obiri, Kenyan politician
Kojo Nana Obiri-Yeboah, Pentecostal pastor